Kineosphaera is a Gram-positive, strictly aerobic non-spore-forming and motile genus of bacteria from the family of Dermatophilaceae.
Kineosphaera limosa has been isolated from activated sludge from Ibaraki Prefecture in Japan.

References

Micrococcales
Bacteria genera
Monotypic bacteria genera